Odesa I. I. Mechnykov National University, located in Odesa, Ukraine, is one of the country's major universities, named after the scientist Élie Metchnikoff (who studied immunology, microbiology, and evolutionary embryology), a Nobel prizewinner in 1908. The university was founded in 1865 by an edict of Tsar Alexander II of Russia, which reorganized the Richelieu Lyceum of Odesa into the new Imperial Novorossiya University. In the Soviet era, the university was renamed Odesa I. I. Mechnykov State University (literally, "Odesa State University named after I. I. Mechnykov").

Odesa I. I. Mechnykov National University comprises four institutes, ten faculties, and seven specialized councils. The university is famous for its scientific library, the largest and oldest of any university in Ukraine (3,600,000 million volumes, ranging from the 15th century to the present day).

Background 

Odesa I. I. Mechnykov National University is one of the oldest in Ukraine. It was founded in 1865, when by edict of the Russian Tsar Alexander II the Richelieu Lyceum (which had existed in Odesa since 1817) was reorganized into the Imperial Novorossiya (New Russia) University. All academic and scientific life of the university—from the day of its foundation—was directed by the statute of 1863 that formed the liberal-democratic tradition of the higher institution which has been preserved in spite of all the disturbances in the social and political life of the country. From the very first years of its existence, the Imperial Novorossiya University became an important center of science and for training the scientific and educational cadres of the northern Black Sea coastal region.

World-famous teachers and scientists have worked at Imperial Novorossiya University during different times of its existence, including the Nobel Prize winner I. I. Mechnykov (after whom the university was later renamed), Professors Ivan Sechenov, A. A. Kovalevskiy, Mykola Hamaliya, N. D. Zelinskiy, Dmitri Mendeleev, physicist G. A. Gamov, mathematician Aleksandr Lyapunov, and others. Through their activities, the Imperial Novorossiya University quickly became one of the centers of the culture of the Ukrainian, Russian, and other peoples dwelling along the northern coast of the Black Sea, and the university began to play an important role in the development of science. The first Rector of the university was Professor I. Y. Sokolov. At different periods of time, the university was headed by Professors P. N. Lebedyev, A. I. Yurzhenko, A. V. Bogatskiy, V. V. Serdyuk, and I. P. Zelinskiy—all prominent specialists in different branches of knowledge.

In 2013, The Ukrainian Week stated that members of the university staff were openly Ukrainophobic.

Organization
The university is situated in two parts of the city and occupies about 70 hectares. It is divided into a number of faculties that are directly administered by the university. The university consists of ten faculties, four institutes, one college, two "preparatory departments" for citizens of Ukraine and foreign countries, 15 scientific-research laboratories, five scientific institutes, administration departments, experimental training shops, and nine dormitories for students, post-graduates, and trainees. The university has a sports and health rehabilitation complex with its own stadium and rest-base for the students, personnel, and university guests in the village of Chernomorka. In all university locations there are cafeterias, cafes, bars, and medical sections.

Departments
Faculty of Biology;
Faculty of International Relationships, Politology and Sociology;
Faculty of Economics and Law;
Faculty of Geology and Geography;
Faculty of History and Philosophy;
Faculty of Journalism, Advertising, and Publishing;
Faculty of Mathematics, Physics and Information Technologies;
Faculty of Psychology and Social Work;
Faculty of Romance and Germanic Philology;
Faculty of Chemistry.

Other
College of Economics and Social Work;
University Preparatory Department;
Preparatory Department for International Students.

Science
11 Scientific research laboratories;
Botanic garden of ONU;
Scientific-Research Institute of Physics;
Astronomic Observatory.

International cooperation
Odesa University has engaged in international cooperation at the regional and global levels for the past 150 years. The university is currently a member of the European University Association, the World Association of Universities, the Supervisory Board of Magna Charta, the Eurasian Association of Universities, the Black Sea Universities Network and the Danube Rectors Conference.

Ranking
7th in Ukraine and 1844th in World, Ranking Web of Universities

Notable alumni

Ivan Sechenov (1829–1905) – Russian physiologist
Nikodim Kondakov (1844–1925) – Russian historian, he founded modern method in Byzantine art history
Sergei Witte (1849–1915) – first prime minister of the Russian Empire
Aleko Konstantinov (1863–1897) – prominent Bulgarian intellectual who founded the tourist movement in Bulgaria
Volodymyr Lypsky (1863–1937) – Ukrainian botanist; member of National Academy of Sciences of Ukraine (in 1922—1928 — its president) and corresponding member of the USSR Academy of Sciences, and the Director of the Botanical Gardens of Odesa University
Mariusz Zaruski (1867–1941) – brigadier-general in the Polish Army, a pioneer of Polish sports yachting
Krste Misirkov (1874–1926) – philologist, journalist, historian and ethnographer
Ion Nistor (1876–1962) – prominent Romanian historian and politician
Moses Schönfinkel (1888–1942) – Russian logician and mathematician
Volodymyr Kedrowsky (1890–1970) – Ukrainian military leader, diplomat, author, and activist
Lev Kritzman (1890–1938) – expelled 1910, later a Soviet agrarian economist
Nykolai Chebotaryov (1894–1947) – Ukrainian and Russian mathematician, best known for the Chebotaryov density theorem
Gherman Pântea (1894–1968) – Bessarabian-born soldier who served as Military Director of the Moldavian Democratic Republic
Kadish Luz (1895–1972) – Israeli politician who served as Minister of Agriculture between 1955 and 1959 and Speaker of the Knesset from 1959 and 1969
Joshua L. Goldberg (1896–1994) – Belarusian-born American rabbi, who was the first rabbi to be commissioned as a U.S. Navy chaplain in World War II (and only the third to serve in the Navy in its history), the first to reach the rank of Navy Captain (the equivalent of Army Colonel), and the first to retire after a full active-duty career
Mordechai Namir (1897–1975) – Israeli minister
George Gamow (1904–1968) – theoretical physicist and cosmologist – notably an early advocate and developer of Lemaître's Big Bang theory.
Petro Karyshkovsky (1921–1968)– Ukrainian historian, numismatist, a scholar and lexicographer.
Ali Mohamed Shein (born 1948) – 7th President of Zanzibar 
Alla Dzhioyeva (born 1949) – South Ossetian teacher turned politician, who served as the Education Minister in 2002–2008
Yevhen Streltsov (born 1949) – Ukrainian professor
Emmanuil Galitskiy – original staff member and head physics professor at the Bergen County Academies, New Jersey
Oksana Mas (born 1969) – Ukrainian artist
Valeria Kuharenko (born 1927) – doctor of philological sciences, professor, head of the department of lexicology and stylistics of the English language (1975-1983). 
Olga Hritsenko (1935–2020) – teacher, scientist, social worker; Honored Teacher of Ukraine

See also 
 List of modern universities in Europe (1801–1945)

References

External links

Odesa University
1865 establishments in the Russian Empire
Educational institutions established in 1865
National universities in Ukraine
1865 establishments in Ukraine